The  Asian Baseball Championship was the fourteenth continental tournament held by the Baseball Federation of Asia. The tournament was held in Tokyo, Japan for the third time. The tournament was won by Chinese Taipei; their first gold medal in the Asian Baseball Championship.

Guam (4th) and India (7th) both made their first appearances at the tournament and became the seventh and eighth teams to contest the championship. Defending champions Japan (2nd), South Korea (3rd), Australia (5th) and China (6th) were the other participants.

References

Bibliography 
 

1987
Asian Baseball Championship
1987 in Japanese sport
Sports competitions in Tokyo